Paaru Wife of Devadas is a 2014 Kannada romantic comedy film starring Srinagar Kitty and Soundarya Jayamala in the lead role. The film is directed by Kiran Govi and produced by Krishna Deva Gowda and Mukhtar. The music for the film is composed by Arjun Janya. The film is slated for release on 27 June 2014.

The film, although takes the character names from the Sharat Chandra's Bengali novel, is depicted in an entirely different manner according to the director. The filming started early February 2013 at the Kanteerava Studios in Bangalore with a song sequence.

Cast
 Srinagar Kitty as Devdas
 Soundarya Jayamala as Paru
 Neha Patil
 Layendra
 V. Manohar
 Mohan Juneja

Soundtrack
The audio of the film was launched in March 2014 at hotel Citadel in Bangalore. Ace playback singer Manjula Gururaj and her husband musician Gururaj were present as the chief guest. It was revealed that the director had roped in local talents who were winners of talent shows for singing the soundtrack of the film. The music is composed by Arjun Janya, consisting of six tracks. While the five songs are written by Nagendra Prasad, one single is written by Jayanth Kaikini.

Reception 
A critic from Deccan Chronicle wrote that "However, there is very little to be thrilled about the movie as it moves on a snail pace embroiled with past events told through the lead female character".

References

External links
 OneIndia information
 Songs list
 Times of India

2014 films
2010s Kannada-language films
Indian romantic comedy films
Films scored by Arjun Janya
2014 romantic comedy films